Justice Punyadasa Edussuriya is a Sri Lankan judge. He was a Judge of the Supreme Court of Sri Lanka and prior to which he served as a Judge of the Court of Appeal. After his retirement he served as a member of the Commission to Investigate Allegations of Bribery or Corruption.

Edussuriya was educated at Royal College Colombo, where his classmates included Justice S. W. B. Wadugodapitiya and Upali Wijewardene.

References

Puisne Justices of the Supreme Court of Sri Lanka
Sinhalese judges
Court of Appeal of Sri Lanka judges
Sinhalese lawyers
Alumni of Royal College, Colombo